G. grandis may refer to:
 Gahnia grandis, a perennial plant species found in southeastern Australia and Tasmania
 Geosaurus grandis, an extinct marine crocodyliform species that lived during the Late Jurassic to the Early Cretaceous
 Gilbertsmithia grandis, an alga species in the genus Gilbertsmithia
 Glechoma grandis, a flowering plant species in the genus Glechoma
 Glirodon grandis, an extinct mammal species found in North America that lived during the Upper Jurassic

See also
 Grandis (disambiguation)